WLEG may refer to:

 WLEG-LP, a low-power radio station (104.3 FM) licensed to serve Goshen, Indiana, United States
 WAOR, a radio station (102.7 FM) licensed to serve Ligonier, Indiana, which held the call sign WLEG from 2002 to 2014